Christianity is the most adhered to religion in Canada, with 19,373,325 Canadians, or 52.3%, identifying themselves as of the 2021 census. The preamble to the Canadian Charter of Rights and Freedoms refers to God. The monarch carries the title of "Defender of the Faith". The French colonization beginning in the 17th century established a Roman Catholic francophone population in New France, especially Acadia and Lower Canada (now Nova Scotia, New Brunswick and Quebec). British colonization brought waves of Anglicans and other Protestants to Upper Canada, now Ontario. The Russian Empire spread Orthodox Christianity in a small extent to the tribes in the far north and western coasts, particularly hyperborean nomadics like the Inuit. Orthodoxy would arrive in mainland Canada with immigrants from the eastern and southern Austro-Hungarian Empire and western Russian Empire starting in the 1890s; then refugees from the Soviet Union, Eastern Bloc, Greece and elsewhere during the last half of the 20th century.

Demographics, concentration, and life
The majority of Canadian Christians attend church services infrequently. Cross-national surveys of religiosity rates such as the Pew Global Attitudes Project indicate that, on average, Canadian Christians are less observant than those of the United States but are still more overtly religious than their counterparts in Western Europe. In 2002, 30% of Canadians reported to Pew researchers that religion was "very important" to them. A 2005 Gallup poll showed that 28% of Canadians consider religion to be "very important" (55% of Americans and 19% of Britons say the same). Regional differences within Canada exist, however, with British Columbia and Quebec reporting especially low metrics of traditional religious observance, as well as a significant urban-rural divide, while Alberta and rural Ontario saw high rates of religious attendance. The rates for weekly church attendance are contested, with estimates running as low as 11% as per the latest Ipsos-Reid poll and as high as 25% as per Christianity Today magazine. This American magazine reported that three polls conducted by Focus on the Family, Time Canada and the Vanier Institute of the Family showed church attendance increasing for the first time in a generation, with weekly attendance at 25 per cent. This number is similar to the statistics reported by premier Canadian sociologist of religion, Prof. Reginald Bibby of the University of Lethbridge, who has been studying Canadian religious patterns since 1975. Although lower than in the US, which has reported weekly church attendance at about 40% since the Second World War, weekly church attendance rates are higher than those in Northern Europe.

As well as the large churches — Roman Catholic, United, and Anglican, which together count more than half of the Canadian population as nominal adherents — Canada also has many smaller Christian groups, including Orthodox Christianity. The Egyptian population in Ontario and Quebec (Greater Toronto in particular) has seen a large influx of the Coptic Orthodox population in just a few decades. The relatively large Ukrainian population of Manitoba and Saskatchewan has produced many followers of the Ukrainian Catholic and Ukrainian Orthodox Churches, while southern Manitoba has been settled largely by Mennonites. The concentration of these smaller groups often varies greatly across the country. Baptists are especially numerous in the Maritimes. The Maritimes, prairie provinces, and southwestern Ontario have significant numbers of Lutherans. Southwest Ontario has seen large numbers of German and Russian immigrants, including many Mennonites and Hutterites, as well as a significant contingent of Dutch Reformed. Alberta has seen considerable immigration from the American plains, creating a significant Mormon minority in that province. The Church of Jesus Christ of Latter-day Saints claimed to have 178,102 members (74,377 of whom in Alberta) at the end of 2007. And according to the Jehovah's Witnesses year report there are 111,963 active members (members who actively preach) in Canada.

Canada as a nation is becoming increasingly religiously diverse, especially in large urban centres such as Toronto, Vancouver, and Montreal, where minority groups and new immigrants who make up the growth in most religious groups congregate. Two significant trends become clear when the current religious landscape is examined closely. One is the loss of 'secularized' Canadians as active and regular participants in the churches and denominations they grew up in, which were overwhelmingly Christian, while these churches remain a part of Canadians' cultural identity. The other is the increasing presence of ethnically diverse immigration within the religious makeup of the country.

As Mainline Protestants and Roman Catholics have experienced drastic losses over the past 30 years, others have been expanding rapidly: overall by 144% in 'Eastern' religions during the 1981-1991 decade. Considering Canada's increasing reliance on immigration to bolster a low birth rate, the situation is only likely to continue to diversify. This increased influx of ethnic immigrants not only affects the types of religions represented in the Canadian context but also the increasingly multicultural and multilingual makeup of individual Christian denominations. From Chinese Anglican or Korean United Church communities, to the Lutheran focus on providing much needed services to immigrants new to the Canadian context and English language, immigration is making changes.

For some Protestant denominations, adapting to a new secular context has meant adjusting to their non-institutional roles in society by increasingly focusing on social justice. However the pull between conservative religious members and the more radical among the church members is complicated by the numbers of immigrant communities who may desire a church that fulfils a more 'institutionally complete' role as a buffer in this new country over the current tension filled debates over same-sex marriage, ordination of women and homosexuals, or the role of women in the church. This of course will depend on the background of the immigrant population, as in the Hong Kong context where ordination of Florence Li Tim Oi happened long before women's ordination was ever raised on the Canadian Anglican church level.

As well a multicultural focus on the churches part may include non-Christian elements (such as the inclusion of a Buddhist priest in one incident) which are unwelcome to the transplanted religious community. Serving the needs and desires of different aspects of the Canadian and newly Canadian populations makes a difficult balancing act for the various mainline churches which are starved for money and active parishioners in a time when 16% of Canadians identify as non-religious and up to two-thirds of those who do identify with a denomination use the church only for its life-cycle rituals governing birth, marriage, and death.

Evangelical portions of the Protestant groups proclaim their growth as well but as Roger O'Tool notes they make up 7% of the Canadian population and seem to gain most of their growth from a higher birthrate. What is significant is the higher participation of their members in contrast to Mainline Protestants and Roman Catholics. This high commitment would seem to translate into the kind of political power evangelicals in the United States enjoy but despite Canada's historically Christian background as Lori Beaman notes neatly "...[forming] the backdrop for social process" explicit religiosity appears to have not effectively moved the government towards legal discrimination against gay marriage. Much as many Roman Catholics in Quebec ignore the Church's stance on birth control, abortion, or premarital sex, the churches do not dictate much of the daily lives of regular Canadians.

There was a major religious revival in Toronto in the nineties known as the Toronto Blessing at a small Vineyard Church near the Toronto Pearson International Airport. This religious event was the largest tourist attraction to Toronto in the year 1994. This event was characterized by unusual religious ecstasy such as being slain in the Spirit, laughing uncontrollably, and other odd behavior.

A 2015 study estimates some 43,000 believers in Christ from a Muslim background in Canada, most of whom belong to the evangelical tradition.

Major denominational families 

Christian denominations in Canada are usually divided into two large groups: Protestantism and the Catholic Church. There are also Christian denominations that do not fall within either of these groups, such as Eastern Orthodoxy and Oriental Orthodoxy, but they are much smaller.

Protestantism 

Protestantism in Canada has existed ever since parts of northern Canada were colonized by the English.

Anabaptism

Amish

The Amish population in Canada as of 2018, is 5,375. There are Amish settlements in four provinces: Ontario, Prince Edward Island, Manitoba, and New Brunswick. The majority of Old Order settlements is located in the province of Ontario, namely Oxford (Norwich Township) and Norfolk counties. A small community is also established in Bruce County (Huron-Kinloss Township) near Lucknow.

Hutterites 

In mid-1870s Hutterites moved from Europe to the Dakota Territory in the United States to avoid military service and other persecutions. During World War I Hutterites suffered from persecutions in the United States because they are pacifist and refused military service. They then moved almost all of their communities to Canada in the Western provinces of Alberta and Manitoba in 1918. In the 1940s, there were 52 Hutterite colonies in Canada.

Today, more than 75% of the world's Hutterite colonies are located in Canada, mainly in Alberta, Manitoba and Saskatchewan, the rest being almost exclusively in the United States. The Hutterite population in North America is about 45,000 people.

Mennonites 

Mennonites first arrived in Canada in 1786 from Pennsylvania, but following Mennonites arrived directly from Europe. The Canadian Conference of Mennonite Brethren Churches had 37,000 members across 250 congregations, and the Mennonite Church Canada had about 35,000 members in 212 congregations in 1998.

Roman Catholicism 

The Catholic Church in Canada, under the spiritual leadership of the Pope and the Canadian Conference of Catholic Bishops, has the largest number of adherents to a religion in Canada, with 38.7% of Canadians (13.07 million) reported as Catholics in the 2011 National Household Survey, in 72 dioceses across the provinces and territories, served by about 8,000 priests. It was the first European faith in what is now Canada, arriving in 1497 when John Cabot landed on Newfoundland and raised the Venetian and Papal banners, claiming the land for his sponsor King Henry VII of England, while recognizing the religious authority of the Roman Catholic Church.

Eastern Orthodoxy 

Adherents of Eastern Orthodox Christianity in Canada belong to several ecclesiastical jurisdictions. Historically, Eastern Orthodoxy was introduced to Canada during the course of 19th century, mainly through emigration of Christians from Eastern Europe and the Middle East. Honoring such diverse heritage, Eastern Orthodoxy in Canada is traditionally organized in accordance with patrimonial jurisdictions of autocephalous Eastern Orthodox Churches, each of them having its own hierarchy with dioceses and parishes. According to 2021 census data, Greek Orthodox community constitutes the largest Eastern Orthodox community in Canada, with 204,025 adherents. It is followed by other communities: Russian Orthodox (28,245), Ukrainian Orthodox (25,975), Serbian Orthodox (25,445), Romanian Orthodox (16,120), Macedonian Orthodox (6,050), Bulgarian Orthodox (3,825), Antiochian Orthodox (2,140) and several other minor communities within Eastern Orthodoxy.

Oriental Orthodoxy 

Adherents of Oriental Orthodox Christianity in Canada also belong to several ethnic communities and ecclesiastical jurisdictions. According to 2011 census data, Coptic Orthodox community constitutes the largest Oriental Orthodox community in Canada, with 16,255 adherents. It is followed by other communities: Armenian Orthodox (13,730), Ethiopian Orthodox (3,025), Syriac Orthodox (3,060) and several other minor communities within Oriental Orthodoxy.

Latter-day Saints 

The Church of Jesus Christ of Latter-day Saints (LDS Church) has had a presence in Canada since its organization in New York State in 1830. Canada has been used as a refuge territory by members of the LDS Church to avoid the anti-polygamy prosecutions by the United States government. The first LDS Church in Canada was established in 1895 in what would become Alberta; it was the first stake of the Church to be established outside the United States. The LDS Church has founded several communities in Alberta.

In 2011, the LDS Church of Canada claimed around 200,000 members; the 2011 Canadian National Household Survey calculates around 100,000. It has congregations in all Canadian provinces and territories and possess at least one temple in six of the ten provinces, including the oldest LDS temple outside the United States. Alberta is the province with the most members of the LDS Church in Canada, having approximately 40% of the total of Canadian LDS Church members and representing 2% of the total population of the province (the National Household survey has Alberta with over 50% of the Canadian Mormons and 1.6% of the province's population), followed by Ontario and British Columbia.

History
Christianity first arrived in the territory later known as Canada in 1497, when the Catholic, John Cabot, landed on Newfoundland, raised the Venetian and Papal banners and claimed the land for his sponsor King Henry VII of England, while recognizing the religious authority of the Roman Catholic Church. A letter of John Day states that Cabot landed on 24 June 1497 and "he landed at only one spot of the mainland, near the place where land was first sighted, and they disembarked there with a crucifix and raised banners with the arms of the Holy Father and those of the King of England".
In 1608, Samuel de Champlain founded the first Catholic colony in Quebec City.

See also

Demographics of Canada
History of religion in Canada
Religion in Canada
Yearbook of American and Canadian Churches

References